Daniel Ducreux (born 11 February 1947) is a French former cyclist. He competed in the individual road race at the 1968 Summer Olympics. His sporting career began with VC Pont-Audemer.

References

External links
 

1947 births
Living people
French male cyclists
Olympic cyclists of France
Cyclists at the 1968 Summer Olympics
Sportspeople from Eure
Cyclists from Normandy